The Ukrainian War of Independence was a series of conflicts involving many adversaries that lasted from 1917 to 1921 and resulted in the establishment and development of a Ukrainian republic, most of which was later absorbed into the Soviet Union as the Ukrainian Soviet Socialist Republic of 1922–1991.

The war consisted of military conflicts between different governmental, political and military forces. Belligerents included Ukrainian nationalists, Ukrainian anarchists, the forces of Germany and Austria-Hungary, the White Russian Volunteer Army, and Second Polish Republic forces. They struggled for control of Ukraine after the February Revolution (March 1917) in the Russian Empire. The Allied forces of Romania and France also became involved. 

The term Ukrainian–Soviet War is commonly used in post-Soviet Ukraine for the events taking place between 1917–21, nowadays regarded essentially as a war between the Ukrainian People's Republic and the Bolsheviks (Russian SFSR and Ukrainian SSR). The war ensued soon after the October Revolution when Lenin dispatched the Antonov's expeditionary group to Ukraine and Southern Russia.

The struggle lasted from February 1917 to November 1921 and resulted in the division of Ukraine primarily between the Soviet Union and Poland. Soviet historical tradition viewed the Bolshevik victory as the liberation of Ukraine from occupation by the armies of Western and Central Europe (including that of Poland). Conversely, modern Ukrainian historians consider it a failed war of independence by the Ukrainian People's Republic against the Bolsheviks.

The conflict can be  viewed within the framework of the Southern Front of the Russian Civil War of 1917–1922, as well as the closing stage of the Eastern Front of the First World War of 1914–1918.

Background

During the First World War Ukraine was in the front lines of the main combatants: the Entente-allied Russian Empire and Romania, and the Central Powers of the German Empire and Austria-Hungary. By the start of 1917, after the Imperial Russian Army's Brusilov Offensive—strategically successful yet costly in terms of the army's manpower—the Tsar's forces held a front line which partially reclaimed Volhynia and eastern Galicia.

The February Revolution of 1917 encouraged many ethnic groups in the Russian Empire to demand greater autonomy and various degrees of self-determination. A month later, the Ukrainian People's Republic was declared in Kyiv as an autonomous entity with close ties to the Russian Provisional Government, and governed by a socialist-dominated Tsentralna Rada ("Central Council"). The weak and ineffective Provisional Government in Petrograd continued its loyalty to the Entente and the increasingly unpopular war, launching the Kerensky Offensive in the summer of 1917. This offensive was a complete disaster for the Russian Army. The German counter-attack caused Russia to lose all their gains of 1916 and ruined the morale of its army, which caused the near-complete disintegration of the armed forces and the governing apparatus all over the vast Russian Empire.

Many deserting soldiers and officers—particularly ethnic Ukrainians—had lost faith in the future of the Empire, and found the increasingly self-determinant Central Rada a much more favorable alternative. Nestor Makhno began his anarchist activity in the south of Ukraine by disarming deserting Russian soldiers and officers who crossed the Haychur River next to Huliaipole, while in the east in the industrial Donets Basin there were frequent strikes by Bolshevik-infiltrated trade unions.

History

Ukraine after the Russian revolution, 1917 

All this led to the October Revolution in Petrograd, which quickly spread all over the empire. The Kiev Bolshevik Uprising in November 1917 led to the defeat of the Russian Republic forces of the Kiev Military District. Soon after, the Central Rada took power in Kyiv, while in late December 1917 the Bolsheviks set up the rival Ukrainian Soviet Socialist Republic in the eastern city of Kharkov—initially also called the "Ukrainian People's Republic". Hostilities against the Central Rada government in Kyiv began immediately. Under these circumstances, independence was declared at the Fourth Universal of the Ukrainian Central Council on 22 January 1918, and the Rada broke ties with the Russian Republic. As in the case of the Baltic countries, the independence of the Rada's Ukrainian People's Republic was not recognized by Russia's new Soviet government.

The Rada had a limited armed force at its disposal (the Ukrainian People's Army) and was hard-pressed by the forces of the Communist Party of Ukraine in Kharkov, where Vladimir Antonov-Ovseenko had established headquarters, intending to cut off Kaledin's forces in the Don from Ukraine.  Bolshevik forces led by Mikhail Artemyevich Muravyov quickly took Poltava, then Yekaterinoslav (Dnipro) on 10 January, Zherminka and Vinnitsa on 23 January, Odesa on 30 January, and Nikolaev on 4 February.  Slowed by the Battle of Kruty on 30 January, but aided by the Kyiv Arsenal January uprising, Kyiv was captured by the Reds on 9 February. The Rada Ministers fled to Zhytomyr. Muravyov then engaged the Romanians occupying Bessarabia. 

Across Ukraine, local Bolsheviks also formed the Odessa and Donetsk–Krivoy Rog Soviet Republics; and in the south Nestor Makhno formed Makhnovshchina—an anarchist territory—then allied his forces with the Bolsheviks. Most remaining Russian Army units either allied with the Bolsheviks or joined the Ukrainian People's Army. A notable exception was Colonel Mikhail Drozdovsky, who marched his White Volunteer Army unit across the whole of Novorossiya to the River Don, defeating Makhno's forces in the process.

German intervention and Hetmanate, 1918

Faced with imminent defeat, the Rada turned to its still hostile opponents—the Central Powers—for a truce and alliance, which was accepted by Germany in the first Treaty of Brest-Litovsk (signed on 9 February 1918) in return for desperately needed food supplies which the Ukrainian People's Republic would provide to the Germans. The Imperial German and Austro-Hungarian armies then drove the Bolshevik forces out of Ukraine, taking Kiev on 1 March. Two days later, the Bolsheviks signed the Treaty of Brest-Litovsk, which formally ended hostilities on the Eastern Front of World War I and left Ukraine in a German sphere of influence. On 13 March 1918, Ukrainian troops and the Austro-Hungarian Army secured Odessa. The Ukrainian People's Army took control of the Donets Basin in April 1918. Also in April 1918 Crimea was cleared of Bolshevik forces by the Ukrainian People's Army and the Imperial German Army. On 5 April 1918, the German army took control of Yekaterinoslav, and 3 days later Kharkov. By April 1918 all Bolshevik gains in Ukraine were lost; this was due to the apathy of the locals and the then-inferior fighting skills of the Red Army compared to their Austro-Hungarian and German counterparts.

Yet disturbances continued throughout Eastern Ukraine, where local Bolsheviks, peasant self-defense groups known as "green armies", and the anarchist Revolutionary Insurgent Army of Ukraine refused to subordinate to Germany. Former Imperial Russian Army General Pavlo Skoropadsky led a successful German-backed coup against the Rada on 29 April. Skoropadsky proclaimed the conservative Ukrainian State (also known as the "Hetmanate") with himself as monarch, and reversed many of the progressive policies of the former government under the Ukrainian Socialist-Revolutionary Party. The new government had close ties to Berlin, but Skoropadsky never declared war on any of the Triple Entente powers; he also placed Ukraine in a position that made it a safe haven for many upper- and middle-class people fleeing Bolshevik Russia, and was keen on recruiting many former Russian Army soldiers and officers.

Despite sporadic harassment from Makhno, the territory of the Hetmanate enjoyed relative peace until November 1918; when the Central Powers were defeated on the Western Front, Germany completely withdrew from Ukraine. Skoropadsky left Kiev with the Germans, and the Hetmanate was in turn overthrown by the Directorate of Ukraine led by the Ukrainian Social Democratic Labour Party.

Resumed hostilities, 1919

Almost immediately after the defeat of Germany, Lenin's government annulled their Brest-Litovsk treaty—which Leon Trotsky described as "no war no peace"—and invaded Ukraine and other countries of Eastern Europe that were formed under German protection. Simultaneously, the collapse of the Central Powers affected the former Austrian province of Galicia, which was populated by Ukrainians and Poles. The Ukrainians proclaimed a Western Ukrainian People's Republic (WUNR) in Eastern Galicia, which wished to unite with the Ukrainian People's Republic (UNR); while the Poles of Eastern Galicia—who were mainly concentrated in Lwów—gave their allegiance to the newly formed Second Polish Republic. Both sides became increasingly hostile with each other. On 22 January 1919, the Western Ukrainian People's Republic and the Ukrainian People's Republic signed an Act of Union in Kyiv. By October 1919, the Ukrainian Galician Army of the WUNR was defeated by Polish forces in the Polish–Ukrainian War and Eastern Galicia was annexed to Poland; the Paris Peace Conference of 1919 granted Eastern Galicia to Poland for 25 years.

The defeat of Germany had also opened the Black Sea to the Allies, and in mid-December 1918 some mixed forces under French command were landed at Odesa and Sevastopol, and months later at Kherson and Mykolaiv. Yet, on 2 April, Louis Franchet d'Espèrey ordered Philippe Henri Joseph d%27Anselme to evacuate Odessa within 72 hours. Similarly, on 30 April, the French evacuated Sevastopol.  According to Kenez, "The French withdrew not in order to avoid defeat, but in order to avoid fighting. They had no plans for evacuation. The French left behind enormous stores of military material. They embarked on an ambitious scheme without clear goals, without an understanding of the consequences and with insufficient forces."

A new, swift Bolshevik offensive overran most of Eastern and central Ukraine in early 1919. Kyiv—under the control of Symon Petliura's Directorate—fell to the Red Army again on 5 February, and the exiled Soviet Ukrainian government was re-instated as the Ukrainian Soviet Socialist Republic. The Ukrainian People's Republic (UNR) was forced to retreat into Eastern Galicia along the Polish border, from Vinnytsia to Kamianets-Podilskyi, and finally to Rivne. According to Chamberlin, April was the greatest Soviet military success in Ukraine, "The Soviet regime was now at least nominally installed all over Ukraina, with the exception of the portion of the Donetz Basin which was held by Denikin." Yet in May, the Soviets had to deal with the mutiny of Otaman Nykyfor Hryhoriv and the advance of Denikin's forces. 

On 25 June 1919, Denikin's Armed Forces of South Russia captured Kharkov, followed by Ekaterinoslav on 30 June. According to Peter Kenez, "Denikin's advance in the Ukraine was most spectatular. He took Poltava on July 31, Odesa on August 23, and Kyiv on August 31." 

Yet by winter the tide of war reversed decisively, and by 1920 all of Eastern and central Ukraine except Crimea was again in Bolshevik hands. The Bolsheviks also betrayed and defeated Nestor Makhno, their former ally against Denikin.

Polish involvement, 1920

Again facing imminent defeat, the UNR turned to its former adversary, Poland; and in April 1920, Józef Piłsudski and Symon Petliura signed a military agreement in Warsaw to fight the Bolsheviks. Just like the former alliance with Germany, this move partially sacrificed Ukrainian sovereignty: Petliura recognised the Polish annexation of Galicia and agreed to Ukraine's role in Piłsudski's dream of a Polish-led federation in Central and Eastern Europe.

Immediately after the alliance was signed, Polish forces joined the Ukrainian army in the Kyiv Offensive to capture central and southern Ukraine from Bolshevik control. Initially successful, the offensive reached Kyiv on 7 May 1920. However, the Polish-Ukrainian campaign was a pyrrhic victory: in late May, the Red Army led by Mikhail Tukhachevsky staged a large counter-offensive south of Zhytomyr which pushed the Polish army almost completely out of Ukraine, except for Lviv in Galicia. In yet another reversal, in August 1920 the Red Army was defeated near Warsaw and forced to retreat. The White forces, now under General Wrangel, took advantage of the situation and started a new offensive in southern Ukraine. Under the combined circumstances of their military defeat in Poland, the renewed White offensive, and disastrous economic conditions throughout the Russian SFSR—these together forced the Bolsheviks to seek a truce with Poland.

End of hostilities, 1921

Soon after the Battle of Warsaw the Bolsheviks sued for peace with the Poles. The Poles, exhausted and constantly pressured by the Western governments and the League of Nations, and with its army controlling the majority of the disputed territories, were willing to negotiate. The Soviets made two offers: one on 21 September and the other on 28 September. The Polish delegation made a counteroffer on 2 October. On the 5th, the Soviets offered amendments to the Polish offer, which Poland accepted. The Preliminary Treaty of Peace and Armistice Conditions between Poland on one side and Soviet Ukraine and Soviet Russia on the other was signed on 12 October, and the armistice went into effect on 18 October. Ratifications were exchanged at Liepāja on 2 November 1920. Long negotiations of the final peace treaty ensued.

Meanwhile, Petliura's Ukrainian forces, which now numbered 23,000 soldiers and controlled territories immediately to the east of Poland, planned an offensive in Ukraine for 11 November but were attacked by the Bolsheviks on 10 November. By 21 November, after several battles, they were driven into Polish-controlled territory.

On 18 March 1921, Poland signed a peace treaty in Riga, Latvia, with Soviet Russia and Soviet Ukraine. This effectively ended Poland's alliance obligations with Petliura's Ukrainian People's Republic. According to this treaty, the Bolsheviks recognized Polish control over Galicia and western Volhynia—the western part of Ukraine—while Poland recognized the larger central parts of Ukrainian territory, as well as eastern and southern areas, as part of Soviet Ukraine.

Having secured peace on the Western front, the Bolsheviks immediately moved to crush the remnants of the White Movement. After a final offensive on the Isthmus of Perekop, the Red Army overran Crimea. Wrangel evacuated the Volunteer Army to Constantinople in November 1920. After its military and political defeat, the Directorate continued to maintain control over some of its military forces; in October 1921, it launched a series of guerrilla raids into central Ukraine that reached as far east as the modern Kyiv Oblast ("Kyiv province"). On 4 November, the Directorate's guerrillas captured Korosten and seized a cache of military supplies, but on 17 November 1921, this force was surrounded by Bolshevik cavalry and destroyed.

Aftermath

In the current Cherkasy Raion of Cherkasy Oblast (then in the Kyiv Governorate), a local man named Vasyl Chuchupak led the "Kholodnyi Yar Republic" which strove for Ukrainian independence. It lasted from 1919 to 1922, making it the last territory held by armed supporters of an independent Ukrainian state before the incorporation of Ukraine into the Soviet Union as the Ukrainian Soviet Socialist Republic.

In 1922, the Russian Civil War was coming to an end in the Far East, and the Communists proclaimed the Union of Soviet Socialist Republics (USSR) as a federation of Russia, Ukraine, Belarus, and Transcaucasia. The Ukrainian Soviet government was nearly powerless in the face of a centralized monolith Communist Party apparatus based in Moscow. In the new state, Ukrainians initially enjoyed a titular nation position during the nativization and Ukrainization periods. However, by 1928 Joseph Stalin had consolidated power in the Soviet Union. Thus a campaign of cultural repression started, cresting in the 1930s when the Holodomor, a massive famine, struck the republic and claimed several million lives. The Polish-controlled part of Ukraine, there was very little autonomy, both politically and culturally, but it was not affected by famine. In the late 1930s the internal borders of the Ukrainian SSR were redrawn with no significant changes.

The political status of Ukraine remained unchanged until the Molotov–Ribbentrop Pact between the USSR and Nazi Germany in August 1939, in which the Red Army allied with Nazi Germany to invade Poland and incorporate Volhynia and Galicia into the Ukrainian SSR. In June 1941, Germany and its allies invaded the Soviet Union and conquered Ukraine completely within the first year of the conflict. Following the Soviet victory on the Eastern Front of World War II, to which Ukrainians greatly contributed, the region of Carpathian Ruthenia—formerly a part of Hungary before 1919, of Czechoslovakia from 1919 to 1939, of Hungary between 1939 and 1944, and again of Czechoslovakia from 1944 to 1945—was incorporated into the Ukrainian SSR, as were parts of interwar Poland. The final expansion of Ukraine took place in 1954, when Crimea was transferred to Ukraine from Russia with the approval of Soviet leader Nikita Khrushchev.

Legacy
The war is portrayed in Mikhail Bulgakov's novel The White Guard.

Many folk songs were written from 1918 to 1922 that were inspired by people and events of this conflict. "Oi u luzi chervona kalyna" and "Oi vydno selo" were inspired by the Ukrainian Sich Riflemen unit of the Austro-Hungarian Army, which became the core battalion of the West Ukrainian People's Republic's Ukrainian Galician Army. "Pisnya pro Tiutiunnyk" was inspired by events surrounding Ukrainian People's Army brigade commander Yuriy Tiutiunnyk. Another song written at this time was "Za Ukrayinu". These "war songs" started to be sung publicly again in the western part of the Ukrainian SSR after the introduction of glasnost (Ukrainian: hlasnist) by Soviet leader Mikhail Gorbachev, and regained popularity throughout Ukraine after independence — especially during the current Russian invasion.

Another musical legacy of this period was the Ukrainian Republic Capella (later the Ukrainian National Chorus), set up in early 1919 by the Directorate government of Symon Petliura. Under the direction of Oleksandr Koshetz, the Capella/Chorus toured Europe and North America from 1919 to 1921 and while in exile from 1922 to 1927; popularising the songs "Shchedryk" and "Oi khodyt son, kolo vikon"—which influenced the composition of the popular English language songs "Carol of the Bells" and "Summertime", respectively.

In the 21st century the Kholodnyi Yar Republic flag was seen during the Euromaidan demonstrations and was later used by the Azov Battalion at the 2014–2022 Donbas front.

Gallery

Notes
1

See also

References

Further reading

External links
 
 
 
 
 Der Vormarsch der Flieger Abteilung 27 in der Ukraine  (The advances of Flight Squadron 27 in Ukraine). This portfolio, comprising 263 photographs mounted on 48 pages, is a photo-documentary of the German occupation and their military advances through southern Ukraine in the spring and summer of 1918.

 

Aftermath of World War I in Ukraine
History of Ukraine (1918–1991)
Wars involving Ukraine
Modern history of Ukraine
Ukrainian People's Republic
Wars of independence
Conflicts in Ukraine
1910s in Ukraine
1920s in Ukraine
Conflicts in 1917
Conflicts in 1918
Conflicts in 1919
Conflicts in 1920
Conflicts in 1921
Polish–Ukrainian wars
Russian Civil War
Russian Revolution in Ukraine
Russian–Ukrainian wars
Russia–Ukraine relations
Wars involving the Soviet Union
Wars involving France
Wars involving Germany
Wars involving Poland
Wars involving Russia
National revivals